Sakineh may refer to:
 Sakineh Mohammadi Ashtiani, Iranian prisoner
 Sakineh 2, a village in Khuzestan Province, Iran